Despicable Me 3 (Original Motion Picture Soundtrack) is the soundtrack album to the 2017 film Despicable Me 3, the fourth instalment in the  Despicable Me franchise and the sequel to Despicable Me 2 (2013). Pharrell Williams produced the soundtrack album, and also contributed five original songs for the film. The other tracks consisted of several pop singles from the 1980s performed by Michael Jackson, Madonna, Nena, A-ha and few songs and themes from the previous installments. The soundtrack for Despicable Me 3 was released on June 23, 2017, featuring sixteen tracks, and was led by two singles – "Yellow Light" and "There's Something Special" – which was made available through digital download and streaming on June 8 and 13, prior to the album release. Heitor Pereira, who worked on the previous installments, had composed the film's music. Despicable Me 3 (Original Motion Picture Score), which featured Pereira's original score of 38 tracks, was released by Back Lot Music on June 30.

Despicable Me 3 (Original Motion Picture Soundtrack)

Track listing 

Notes

  signifies a co-producer
  signifies an additional producer

Reception 
Tall Writer of Seattle Post-Intelligencer wrote that "Solid entertainment and some education on the classics make the Despicable Me 3 original motion picture soundtrack a decent offering". Jordan Mintzer of The Hollywood Reporter called the songs as "catchy" and praised Williams' songs and "the music cues ranging from Michael Jackson to Van Halen to A-ha". Peter Debruge of Variety said "the movie can hardly find room for Heitor Pereira’s funky score, and though Pharrell Williams has contributed five new songs to sell soundtracks (including the sweet “There’s Something Special”), the movie hardly needs them."

Wenlei Ma of News.com.au wrote about the use of 80s pop hits to equate Bratt's character, received praise and called that "audience might tap toes for the songs". Rotoscopers-based Morgan Stradling said "One thing that Despicable Me has always done well is a great soundtrack and these new tracks do not disappoint. They are catchy, upbeat and very much on brand for the franchise, especially since Pharrell Williams is at the helm yet again. While there isn’t a runaway hit like “Happy” from the second film, the songs that are in the movie play well in the moment." The soundtrack received a mixed review from Soumya Srivatsava of Hindustan Times, who said "The soundtrack, with all the throwback hits from the ‘80s, gets you tapping your feet more often. However, even with all the work done by Pharell Williams on this one, he couldn’t deliver another Happy like last time."

Charts

Despicable Me 3 (Original Motion Picture Score)

Track listing

Additional music 
Songs not featured in the soundtrack, but played in the film are:

 "Take My Breath Away" – Berlin
 "Bad (Dance Extended Mix)" – Michael Jackson
 "Jump" – Eddie Van Halen, Alex Van Halen, David Lee Roth
 "María (Pablo Flores Spanglish Radio Edit) – Ricky Martin
 "Physical" – Olivia Newton-John
 "Sussudio" – Phil Collins
 "Happy Birthday" – Mildred J. Hill, Patty Hill
 "Fight Night" – Migos
 "Take on Me" – A-ha
 "Garota De Ipanema" – Antonio Carlos Jobim, Vinicius de Moraes
 "99 Bottles of Beer" – Traditional
 "Money for Nothing" – Dire Straits

Personnel 
Credits adapted from AllMusic
 Pharrell Williams – album producer
 Heitor Pereira – score producer
 Mike Larson – recording, arrangements, programming and editing
 Andrew Coleman – recording, electric guitar
 Eric Liljestrand – recording
 Emily Joseph – additional arrangements, programming
 John Jennings Boyd – additional arrangements, programming
 Kenny Wood – additional arrangements, programming
 Reuben Cohen – mastering
 Leslie Brathwaite – mixing
 Mick Guzauski – mixing
 Fabian Marasciullo – mixing
 Greg Hayes – mixing
 Alex Robinson – recording assistance
 Ben Sedano – recording assistance
 Bruno Oggoni – recording assistance
 Darryl Johnson – recording assistance
 David Kim – recording assistance
 Eric Eylands – recording assistance
 Hart Gunther – recording assistance
 Jacob Dennis – recording assistance
 Jordan Silva – recording assistance
 Rick Bryant – recording assistance
 Sam Allison – recording assistance
 Thomas Cullison – recording assistance
 Ward Kuykendall – recording assistance
 Sebastian Zuleta – editing assistance
 Ghazi Hourani – editing assistance
 Josh Gudwin – editing assistance
 Elizabeth Gallardo – mixing assistance
 Brandon James – mixing assistance
 Peter Rotter – music contractor
 Jasper Randall – vocal contractor
 Copyist Booker White – music preparation
 Jake Voulgarides – music co-ordinator
 Nikki Walsh – music co-ordinator
 Mike Knobloch – executive in charge of music
 Kyle Staggs – music business affairs
 Tanya Perara – music business affairs
 Rachel Levy – music supervisor
 Cynthia Lu – backing vocalist
 Andrew Simmons – backing vocalist
 Phi Hollinger – backing vocalist
 Rhea Dummett – backing vocalist
 Dane Little – cello
 Erika Duke – cello
 Rudolph Stein – cello
 Stefanie Fife – cello
 Centre For Young Musicians – choir
 Norman Hughes – concertmaster
 Curt Bisquera – drums
 Brent Paschke – electric guitar
 Arturo Sandoval – horns
 Dan Greco – marimba
 Suzie Katamya – orchestra conductor
 Bruce Fowler – orchestra leader, trombone
 Edward Trybek – orchestrator
 Henri Wilkinson – orchestrator
 Jonathan Beard – orchestrator
 Alan Kaplan – trombone
 Philip Teele – trombone
 Steven Holtman – trombone
 Walter Fowler – trumpet
 John Fumo – trumpet
 Warren Luening – trumpet
 William Roper – tuba
 Alan Grunfeld – violin
 Gerardo Hilera – violin
 Mario De Leon – violin
 Natalie Leggett – violin
 Philip Vaiman – violin
 Susan Chatman – violin
 Vladimir Polimatidi – violin

References 

2017 soundtrack albums
Back Lot Music soundtracks
Columbia Records soundtracks
Pharrell Williams albums
Albums produced by Pharrell Williams
Albums produced by Alan Tarney
Albums produced by Madonna
Albums produced by Michael Jackson
Albums produced by Quincy Jones
Albums produced by Reinhold Heil
Albums produced by Stephen Bray
Pop soundtracks
Hip hop soundtracks
Rhythm and blues soundtracks
Funk soundtracks
Soul soundtracks
Classical albums
Film scores